Dorian Gray is a fictional character and the protagonist of Oscar Wilde's 1890 novel The Picture of Dorian Gray. He is an aristocratic Victorian man.

Background 
Dorian is the grandson of the late Lord Kelso. Dorian's mother, Lady Margaret Devereux, was portrayed as a beautiful aristocrat who married below her class without the consent of her father. Lord Kelso then paid a man to provoke Dorian's father, a junior military officer, into a duel, leading to the death of Dorian's father. Margaret then returned to Kelso's home, but died soon after. It is revealed that Lord Kelso raised Dorian until Kelso's death, but that the two had a mutual dislike for each other.

Plot 
The novel's plot varies among the published versions. The summary below deals with the longest version, the 1891 novel. However, certain episodes describe in particular Dorian's encounter with (and subsequent murder of) James Vane. This does not appear in the version originally submitted by Wilde for publishing.

The Picture of Dorian Gray begins on a summer day in Victorian England, where Lord Henry Wotton, an opinionated man, is observing the sensitive artist Basil Hallward painting a portrait of Dorian Gray, a handsome young man, who is Basil's ultimate muse. While posing for the painting, Dorian listens to Lord Henry espousing his hedonistic worldview and begins to think that pursuits of pleasure are the only things in life worth pursuing. This prompts Dorian to wish that his painted image would age instead of himself.

Under the hedonistic influence of Lord Henry, Dorian fully explores his sensuality. He discovers the actress Sibyl Vane, who performs Shakespeare in a dingy working-class theatre. Dorian approaches and courts her and soon proposes marriage. The enamored Sibyl calls him "Prince Charming" and swoons with elation at the prospect of true love. However, her protective brother James warns that if "Prince Charming" harms her, he will murder him.

Dorian invites Basil and Lord Henry to see Sibyl perform, but she is too enamored with Dorian to act and performs poorly. This causes both Basil and Lord Henry to think that Dorian has fallen in love with Sibyl because of her beauty instead of her acting talent. Embarrassed, Dorian rejects Sibyl, telling her that acting was her beauty and without that, she no longer interests him. On returning home, Dorian notices that the portrait has changed; his wish has come true, and the man in the portrait bears a subtle sneer of cruelty.

Conscience-stricken and lonely, Dorian resolves to reconcile with Sibyl, but he is too late as Lord Henry informs him that Sibyl has committed suicide by swallowing prussic acid. Dorian then understands that, where his life is headed, lust and good looks will serve him well. He locks the portrait up, and over the following eighteen years, he experiments with every vice possible, influenced by a morally poisonous French novel that Lord Henry Wotton gave him. The narrative does not reveal the title of the French novel, but, at trial, Wilde said that the novel referred to in Dorian Gray was À rebours (Against Nature, 1884) by Joris-Karl Huysmans, but then denied that the book is the one to which he referred.

One night, before leaving for Paris, Basil visits Dorian's house to ask him about various rumors regarding his vulgar self-indulgence. Dorian does not deny his debauchery and takes Basil to see the portrait. The portrait has become so hideous that Basil is only able to identify it as his work by the signature that he affixes to all his portraits. Basil is horrified and beseeches Dorian to pray for salvation. In anger, Dorian blames his fate on Basil and stabs him to death. Dorian then calmly blackmails an old friend, the scientist Alan Campbell, into using his knowledge of chemistry to destroy the body. Alan later takes his own life as a result of the shameful collaboration.

To escape the guilt of his crime, Dorian goes to an opium den, where James Vane is unknowingly present. James had been seeking vengeance upon Dorian ever since Sibyl killed herself, but he had no leads to pursue; the only thing he knew about Dorian was the name Sibyl called him, "Prince Charming". In the opium den, however, he hears someone refer to Dorian as "Prince Charming", and he accosts Dorian. Dorian deceives James into believing he is too young to have known Sibyl, who killed herself eighteen years earlier, as his face is still that of a young man. James relents and releases Dorian, but is then approached by a woman from the opium den who reproaches James for not killing him. She confirms the man was Dorian Gray and explains that he has not aged in eighteen years. James runs after Dorian, but he has left.

James then begins to stalk Dorian, causing him to fear for his life. However, during a shooting party, one of its members accidentally kills James Vane, who was lurking in a thicket. On returning to London, Dorian tells Lord Henry that he will live righteously from then on. His new probity begins with a resolution not to break the heart of the naïve Hetty Merton, his current romantic interest. Dorian wonders if his new-found goodness has reverted the corruption in the picture, but when he looks, he sees only an even uglier image of himself. From that, Dorian understands that his true motives for moral reformation were, in fact, immoral, due to their being merely a means to a selfish end.

Deciding that only full confession will absolve him of his wrongdoing, Dorian decides to destroy the only piece of evidence remaining of his crimes – the picture. In a rage, he takes the knife with which he murdered Basil and stabs the picture. The servants of the house awaken on hearing a cry from the locked room; on the street, a passerby who also heard the cry calls the police. On entering the locked room, the servants find an unknown old man, stabbed in the heart, his face and figure withered and decrepit. The servants identify the disfigured corpse as Dorian by the rings on its fingers; beside him is the picture of Dorian Gray, restored to its original beauty.

Depictions on screen

 Dorian Grays Portræt (1910)
 Directed by Axel Strøm
 Starring Valdemar Psilander as Dorian Gray
 The Picture of Dorian Gray (1913)
 Directed by Phillips Smalley
 Starring Wallace Reid as Dorian Gray
 The Picture of Dorian Gray (1915)
 Directed by Eugene Moore
 The Picture of Dorian Grey (1916)
 Directed by Vsevolod Meyerhold and Mikhail Doronin
 The Picture of Dorian Gray (1916)
 Directed by Fred W Durrant; screenplay by Rowland Talbot
 Starring Henry Victor as Dorian Gray
 Das Bildnis des Dorian Gray (1917)
 Directed by Richard Oswald; screenplay by Richard Oswald
 Starring Bernd Aldor as Dorian Gray
 Az Élet királya (1918)
 Directed by Alfréd Deésy; screenplay by József Pakots
 Starring Norbert Dán as Dorian Gray
 The Picture of Dorian Gray (1945)
 Directed by Albert Lewin; screenplay by Albert Lewin
 Starring Hurd Hatfield as Dorian Gray
 Armchair Theatre: The Picture of Dorian Gray (1961) (made-for-television)
 Directed by Charles Jarrott
 Starring Jeremy Brett as Dorian Gray
 Golden Showcase: The Picture of Dorian Gray (1961) (made-for-television)
 Directed by Paul Bogart; screenplay by Jacqueline Babbin and Audrey Maas
 Starring John Fraser as Dorian Gray
 El Retrato de Dorian Gray (1969): A telenovela produced by Televisa
 Directed and produced by Ernesto Alonso
 Starring Enrique Álvarez Félix as Dorian Gray
 Dorian Gray, also known as The Evils of Dorian Gray or The Secret of Dorian Gray(1970)
 Directed by Massimo Dallamano; screenplay by Marcello Coscia; Massimo Dallamano and Günter Ebert
 Starring Helmut Berger as Dorian Gray
 The Picture of Dorian Gray (1973) (made-for-television)
 Directed by Glenn Jordan; screenplay by John Tomerlin
 Starring Shane Briant as Dorian Gray
 The Picture of Dorian Gray (1976) (made-for-television)
 Directed by John Gorrie; screenplay by John Osborne
 Starring Peter Firth as Dorian Gray
 Le Portrait de Dorian Gray (1977)
 Directed by Pierre Boutron; screenplay by Pierre Boutron
 Starring Patrice Alexsandre as Dorian Gray
 The Sins of Dorian Gray (1983) (made-for-television)
 Directed by Tony Maylam; screenplay by Ken August and Peter Lawrence
 Starring Belinda Bauer as a female Dorian Gray
 This version sees Dorian Gray as an actress and photographic model who becomes immortal, while an audition tape she made ages for her.
 The League of Extraordinary Gentlemen (2003)
 Directed by Stephen Norrington, produced by (and starring) Sean Connery
 Starring Stuart Townsend as Dorian Gray (in this movie, well above 20, considered "immortal", impervious to weapons, and killed by seeing his own portrait)
 Pact with the Devil, also known as Dorian (2004)
 Directed by Allan A. Goldstein; screenplay by Peter Jobin and Ron Raley
 Starring Ethan Erickson as Louis/Dorian
 Dorian (2004)
 Written and Directed by Brendan Dougherty Russo
 Starring Andrew Vanette as Dorian Gray
 The Picture of Dorian Gray (2004)
 Directed by David Rosenbaum; screenplay by David Rosenbaum
 Starring Josh Duhamel as Dorian Gray
 The Picture of Dorian Gray (2006)
 Directed by Duncan Roy; screenplay by Duncan Roy
 Starring David Gallagher as Dorian Gray
 The Picture of Dorian Gray (2007)
 Directed by Jon Cunningham; screenplay by Jon Cunningham and Deborah Warner
 The Picture (of Dorian Gray) (2009)
 Directed by Jonathan Courtemanche; script by Neal Utterback
 Starring Hanna Dillon, Lawrence Evans, and Miles Heymann
 Dorian Gray (2009)
 Directed by Oliver Parker; screenplay by Toby Finlay
 Starring Ben Barnes as Dorian Gray
 Penny Dreadful (2014–2016)
 Created by John Logan
 Starring Reeve Carney as Dorian Gray
 Chilling Adventures of Sabrina (2018–2019)
 Created by Roberto Aguirre-Sacasa
 Starring Jedidiah Goodacre as Dorian Gray

References

Literary characters introduced in 1890
Oscar Wilde
The Picture of Dorian Gray
Fictional characters who have made pacts with devils
Fictional lords and ladies
Fictional characters with immortality
Fictional characters with slowed ageing
Fictional suicides
Male characters in literature
Characters in British novels of the 19th century